Hello Afrika (The Album) is the debut studio album from Swedish-based Nigerian artist Dr. Alban, released in 1990. The album was produced by Denniz Pop and released through the label SweMix Records. The album was also released as a second edition in 1991, with a different track listing.

Track listing

Original version
 "The Alban Prelude" (1:33)
 "U & Mi" (3:44)
 "No Coke" (with Intro) (7:00)
 "Sweet Reggae Music" (5:25)
 "Hello Afrika" (5:44)
 "China Man" (5:04)
 "Groove Machine II" (2:08)
 "Proud! (To Be Afrikan)" (4:16)
 "Our Father (Pater Noster)" (4:40)
 "Man & Woman" (5:09)
 "No Coke (No Hasch-Hasch Mix)" (6:10)
 "Hello Afrika (42 Street Mix)" (6:29)
 "Thank You" (4:19)

2nd edition
 "The Alban Prelude" (1:35)
 "U & Mi" (3:47)
 "No Coke" (6:41)
 "Sweet Reggae Music" (5:27)
 "Hello Afrika" (5:45)
 "(Sing Shi-Wo-Wo) Stop the Pollution" (3:42)
 "Our Father (Pater Noster)" (4:44)
 "Proud! (To Be Afrikan)"(4:17)
 "Groove Machine 2" (2:10)
 "U & Mi|U & Mi (Remix 91)]]" (5:02)
 "No Coke (Float Remix)" (3:49)

Charts

Weekly charts

Year-end charts

Sales and certifications

References

Dr. Alban albums
1990 debut albums